Henry Lamb (20 September 1835 – 13 January 1903) was an Australian politician.

Lamb was born in Spring Cove in Sydney in 1835. In 1877 he was elected to the Tasmanian House of Assembly, representing the seat of Clarence. He served the seat's abolition in 1886. In 1891 he was elected to the Tasmanian Legislative Council for Pembroke, where he served until 1899. He died in 1903 in Bellerive.

References

1835 births
1903 deaths
Members of the Tasmanian House of Assembly
Members of the Tasmanian Legislative Council